Federal elections were held in Germany on 30 July 1878. The National Liberal Party remained the largest party in the Reichstag, with 97 of the 397 seats. Voter turnout was 63.4%.

Results

Alsace-Lorraine

References

Federal elections in Germany
Germany
1878 elections in Germany
Elections in the German Empire
July 1878 events